The Willacy County State Jail is a privately owned medium-security prison for men located in Raymondville, Willacy County, Texas, operated by Corrections Corporation of America under contract with the Texas Department of Criminal Justice.  CCA has run the facility since 2004, and it has an official capacity of 1069 inmates.  

This facility is adjacent to two other private prison sites:  the Willacy County Correctional Center, operated by the Management and Training Corporation for the federal government and closed in 2015, and the Willacy County Regional Detention Center, also operated by MTC for the federal government.  

This facility was first opened by Wackenhut, now GEO Group, in 1996.  On April 26, 2001 inmate Gregorio De La Rosa, Jr. was beaten to death by other prisoners.  This incident caused a $42.5 million civil settlement against Wackenhut.

References

Prisons in Texas
Buildings and structures in Willacy County, Texas
CoreCivic
1996 establishments in Texas